The Seventy-third session of the United Nations General Assembly was opened on 18 September 2018. The President of the United Nations General Assembly was from the GRULAC group.

Organisation for the session

President 
Ecuadorian Foreign Minister, María Fernanda Espinosa Garcés was elected as President of the General Assembly on 5 June 2018.

Vice-Presidents 
There will be twenty-one Vice-Presidents for the 73rd Session. They will be:

The five permanent members of the Security Council:
 
 
 
  United Kingdom of Great Britain and Northern Ireland
  United States of America
As well as the following nations:
 
 
 
 
 
  Gambia (Republic of The)

Committees 
The following were elected as Chairs and officers of the General Assembly committees for the 73rd Session:

First Committee (Disarmament and International Security)

Second Committee (Economic and Financial)

Third Committee (Social, Humanitarian and Cultural)

Fourth Committee (Special Political and Decolonization)

Fifth Committee (Administrative and Budgetary)

Sixth Committee (Legal)

Seat Allocation 
As is tradition during each session of the General Assembly, Secretary-General António Guterres will draw lots to see which member state would take the helm at the first seat in the General Assembly Chamber, with the other member states following according to the English translation of their name, the same order would be followed in the six main committees. For this session, Mali was chosen to take the first seat of the General Assembly Chamber.

General Debate 

Most states will have a representative speaking about issues concerning their country and the hopes for the coming year as to what the UNGA will do. This is an opportunity for the member states to opine on international issues of their concern. The General Debate will occur from 25 September to 1 October 2018, with the exception of the intervening Sunday. The theme for this year's debate was chosen by President María Fernanda Espinosa as “Making the United Nations relevant to all people: Global leadership and shared responsibilities for peaceful, equitable and sustainable societies”.

The order of speakers is given first to member states, then observer states and supranational bodies. Any other observers entities will have a chance to speak at the end of the debate, if they so choose. Speakers will be put on the list in the order of their request, with special consideration for ministers and other government officials of similar or higher rank. According to the rules in place for the General Debate, the statements should be in one of the United Nations official languages of Arabic, Chinese, English, French, Russian or Spanish, and will be translated by the United Nations translators. Each speaker is requested to provide 20 advance copies of their statements to the conference officers to facilitate translation and to be presented at the podium. Speeches are requested to be limited to five minutes, with seven minutes for supranational bodies.

Foreign ministers and high representatives participating in the General Debate signed the Code of Conduct Towards Achieving a World Free of Terrorism. The Code of Conduct was the brainchild of Kazakhstan's President Nursultan Nazarbayev. The main goal of the document is implementation of a wide range of international commitments to counter terrorism and establishing a broad global coalition towards achieving a world free of terrorism by 2045.

Resolutions

The following are resolutions the General Assembly has passed in its 73rd session, .

Elections

References

External links
 President of the 73rd General Assembly
 Agenda for the 73rd General Assembly

2018 in the United Nations
2019 in the United Nations
Sessions of the United Nations General Assembly
United Nations General Assembly resolutions